William Vaughan (c. 1707–12 April 1775) of Corsygedol, Merioneth was a Welsh politician.

He was the eldest son of Richard Vaughan of Corsygedol and educated at Chester and Mortlake schools and St John's College, Cambridge (1726). He succeeded his father in 1734. Evan Lloyd Vaughan was his younger brother.

He was the Lord Lieutenant of Merionethshire 1762–1775, Custos Rotulorum of Merionethshire 1731–1775 and Member of Parliament (MP) for Merionethshire from 1734 to 1768.

He married his cousin Catherine, the daughter and coheiress of Hugh Nanney, M.P., of Nannau, Merioneth, with whom he had a daughter who predeceased him. He was succeeded by his brother Evan.

References

 

1775 deaths
Alumni of St John's College, Cambridge
Members of the Parliament of Great Britain for Welsh constituencies
British MPs 1734–1741
British MPs 1741–1747
British MPs 1747–1754
British MPs 1754–1761
British MPs 1761–1768
Year of birth uncertain
Lord-Lieutenants of Merionethshire